City Nord is a shopping center located at Stormyra in Bodø, Norway. Measuring  and with more than 100 stores, it is the largest shopping center in Northern Norway. The shopping center opened in 1994 and has been expanded several times, first in 2008. The center suffered minor damage in a fire in December 2008.

These fears appeared to be allayed by early 2012, with the trade balance in the town evening out. The expanded center was opened on 10 November 2011 by the mayor of Bodø, Ole-Henrik Hjartøy, and the CEO of Coop Nordland, Lars Arve Jakobsen. By the completion of the 2014–2015 expansion, City Nord was expected to be among the ten largest shopping centers in Norway. In 2014, City Nord management announced that by November 2015, the mall would measure , equalling the size of Jekta Storsenter. City Nord is aimed at a customer base from both Bodø and the rest of the Salten region of Nordland.

City Nord has a  multi-storey car park, with capacity in excess of 800 cars.

References

External links
 

Buildings and structures in Bodø
Shopping centres in Norway
1994 establishments in Norway
Shopping malls established in 1994